Pine Mountain is a town in Harris and Meriwether counties in the U.S. state of Georgia. As of the 2020 census it had a population of 1,216.

The Harris County portion of Pine Mountain is part of the Columbus, GA-AL Metropolitan Statistical Area, while the small portion that extends into Meriwether County is part of the Atlanta-Sandy Springs-Roswell Metropolitan Statistical Area.

History
The town began in 1882 when the railroad spread to Pine Mountain from Columbus, and until 1958, the community was known as "Chipley". The name was changed to "Pine Mountain" due to the existence of Callaway Gardens.

Geography
Pine Mountain is located in northeastern Harris County, with a small portion extending north into the southwestern corner of Meriwether County. The town is located along U.S. Route 27, which runs north to south through the town, leading northwest  to LaGrange and south  to Hamilton, the Harris County seat. Georgia State Route 18 and Georgia State Route 354 intersect U.S. Route 27 in the town limits. Route 18 leads west  to West Point and northeast  to Greenville. The town is located at the northern base of the Pine Mountain Range.

Attractions
Located in Pine Mountain are the Callaway Gardens and Pine Mountain Wild Animal Safari.

The Pine Mountain Trail, a  hiking trail, is nearby in F. D. Roosevelt State Park.

Demographics

As of the census of 2000, there were 1,141 people, 480 households, and 314 families residing in the town. The racial makeup of the town was 55.92% White, 41.37% African American, 0.26% Native American, 0.09% Asian, 0.09% Pacific Islander, 0.09% from other races, and 2.19% from two or more races.  1.49% of the population were Hispanic or Latino of any race.

There were 480 households, out of which 31.3% had children under the age of 18 living with them, 40.4% were married couples living together, 21.5% had a female householder with no husband present, and 34.4% were non-families. 29.6% of all households were made up of individuals, and 17.1% had someone living alone who was 65 years of age or older.  The average household size was 2.38 and the average family size was 2.91.

In the town, the population was spread out, with 26.5% under the age of 18, 8.2% from 18 to 24, 27.9% from 25 to 44, 18.7% from 45 to 64, and 18.8% who were 65 years of age or older.  The median age was 35 years. For every 100 females, there were 75.3 males.  For every 100 females age 18 and over, there were 66.1 males.

The median income for a household in the town was $31,685, and the median income for a family was $36,429. Males had a median income of $28,889 versus $19,524 for females. The per capita income for the town was $16,486.  19.3% of the population and 17.7% of families were below the poverty line.   26.5% of those under the age of 18 and 9.3% of those 65 and older were living below the poverty line.

Photo gallery

References

External links
 
 Pine Mountain Tourism Association
 Bethany Baptist Church historical marker (side 1)
 Bethany Baptist Church historical marker (side 2)
 Chipley-Pine Mountain historical marker
 The Iron Horse historical marker

 

Towns in Harris County, Georgia
Towns in Meriwether County, Georgia
Towns in Georgia (U.S. state)
Columbus metropolitan area, Georgia